South College Street Historic District may refer to:

South College Street Historic District (Brandon, Mississippi), listed on the National Register of Historic Places in Rankin County, Mississippi
South College Street Historic District (Covington, Tennessee), listed on the National Register of Historic Places in Tipton County, Tennessee